Konstantin Nikolayevich Glavatskikh (born 16 April 1985 in Udmurtia, Soviet Union) is a cross-country skier from Russia. He competed for Russia at the 2014 Winter Olympics in the cross-country skiing events.

Cross-country skiing results
All results are sourced from the International Ski Federation (FIS).

Olympic Games

World Championships

World Cup

Season standings

Team podiums
 1 podium – (1 )

References

1985 births
Living people
Olympic cross-country skiers of Russia
Cross-country skiers at the 2014 Winter Olympics
Russian male cross-country skiers
Tour de Ski skiers
Universiade medalists in cross-country skiing
Universiade bronze medalists for Russia
Competitors at the 2009 Winter Universiade
Sportspeople from Udmurtia